Michael Morrison (born July 11, 1979) is an American former professional ice hockey goaltender who played in the National Hockey League (NHL) for the Edmonton Oilers, Ottawa Senators and the Phoenix Coyotes.

Early life
Morrison was born in Medford, Massachusetts. As a youth, he played in the 1993 Quebec International Pee-Wee Hockey Tournament with a minor ice hockey team from the Montreal South Shore.

Career 
Morrison was selected in the 1998 NHL Entry Draft by the Edmonton Oilers, in the 7th round, 186th overall. He then played for the University of Maine for 4 years. He spent time playing for the ECHL's Columbus Cottonmouths, Greenville Grrrowl, and the AHL with the Edmonton Road Runners.

After the NHL lockout, Morrison was given a chance to play in the NHL when goaltenders Ty Conklin and Jussi Markkanen were unable to work for the Edmonton Oilers. He made his NHL debut on November 7, 2005, playing 18 minutes in relief during a shut-out defeat to the Dallas Stars. In his first start at Denver, he stopped 31 shots to put his team on top 5–2 against the home team, the Colorado Avalanche on November 14. He eventually became the Oilers' starting goaltender. On March 7, 2006, Oilers head coach Craig MacTavish made a decision to replace Conklin with Morrison before heading into a shootout against the Dallas Stars. The Oilers ended up losing by a shootout goal from Jussi Jokinen.

On March 8, 2006 the Oilers traded their 1st round pick in the 2006 NHL Entry Draft to the Minnesota Wild for goaltender Dwayne Roloson. Since Edmonton had to unload a goaltender and could not find a trade partner, they placed Morrison on waivers, and he was picked up by the Ottawa Senators to back up Ray Emery.

On July 2, 2006, he was signed as a free agent by the Phoenix Coyotes to back up former Curtis Joseph and work with head coach Wayne Gretzky, and goaltender coach Grant Fuhr, all former Oilers. After posting a 0–3 record, a 6.14 goals against average and a .790 save percentage, Morrison was placed on waivers once again. He was not picked up and was sent to the minors. Morrison finished the year in the ECHL.

Morrison signed to play for HDD Olimpija Ljubljana in EBEL for the 2008-09 season, leaving from the Bridgeport Sound Tigers of the AHL.

On January 7, 2009, Morrison signed with Modo Hockey in the Swedish elite league Elitserien. Morrison then signed a one-year contract with the Albany River Rats in the American Hockey League on August 11, 2009.

Career statistics

Awards and honors

References

External links
 

1979 births
Living people
Albany River Rats players
American men's ice hockey goaltenders
Bridgeport Sound Tigers players
Columbus Cottonmouths (ECHL) players
Edmonton Oilers draft picks
Edmonton Oilers players
Edmonton Road Runners players
Florida Everblades players
Greenville Grrrowl players
HDD Olimpija Ljubljana players
Ice hockey players from Massachusetts
Maine Black Bears men's ice hockey players
Modo Hockey players
Ottawa Senators players
Sportspeople from Medford, Massachusetts
Phillips Exeter Academy alumni
Phoenix Coyotes players
Phoenix RoadRunners players
San Antonio Rampage players
Toronto Roadrunners players
Utah Grizzlies (ECHL) players
NCAA men's ice hockey national champions
People from Medford, Massachusetts